Niccolo Pacinotti (born 5 February 1995 in Florence) is an Italian cyclist, who last competed for UCI Professional Continental team .

He won the Hopplà Petroli Firenze in 2017.

Major results
2012
 1st Trofeo Buffoni

References

External links

1995 births
Living people
Italian male cyclists
Cyclists from Florence